is an English contract law case on the measure of damages for disappointing breaches of contract.

Facts
Mr. Jarvis was a solicitor for Barking Council. He chose to go for Christmas holiday in Switzerland. He got a brochure from Swan Tours Ltd, which for Mörlialp, Giswil said the attractions were,

House Party Centre with special resident host. ... Mörlialp is a most wonderful little resort on a sunny plateau ... Up there you will find yourself in the midst of beautiful alpine scenery, which in winter becomes a wonderland of sun, snow and ice, with a wide variety of fine ski-runs, a skating rink and exhilarating toboggan run ... Why did we choose the Hotel Krone ... mainly and most of all because of the 'Gemütlichkeit' and friendly welcome you will receive from Herr and Frau Weibel. ... The Hotel Krone has its own Alphütte Bar which will be open several evenings a week. ... No doubt you will be in for a great time, when you book this houseparty holiday ... Mr. Weibel, the charming owner, speaks English.

In a special yellow box it said,

Swans House Party in Mörlialp. All these House Party arrangements are included in the price of your holiday. Welcome party on arrival. Afternoon tea and cake for 7 days. Swiss dinner by candlelight. Fondue party. Yodeler evening. Chali farewell party in the 'Alphütte Bar'. Service of representative.

It also stated, "Hire of Skis, Sticks and Boots ... Ski Tuition ... 12 days £11.10." Mr Jarvis booked 15 days with a ski pack in August 1969 for £63.45, including Christmas supplement. He flew from Gatwick to Zurich on December 20, 1969, and returned on January 3, 1970. He found the "house party" was only 13 people in the first week and none in the second week. Mr Weibel could not speak English. As Lord Denning MR said,

So there was Mr. Jarvis, in the second week, in this hotel with no house party at all, and no one could speak English, except himself. He was very disappointed, too, with the ski-ing. It was some distance away at Giswil. There were no ordinary length skis. There were only mini-skis, about 3 ft. long. So he did not get his ski-ing as he wanted to. In the second week he did get some longer skis for a couple of days, but then, because of the boots, his feet got rubbed and he could not continue even with the long skis. So his ski-ing holiday, from his point of view, was pretty well ruined.

There were also no Swiss cakes, just crisps and little dry nut cakes. The "yodeler" was a local man who came in work clothes and sang four or five songs quickly. The "Alphütte Bar" was empty and only open one evening.

Mr Jarvis sued for breach of contract. The trial judge awarded £31.72, as the difference between the value paid and the value of the service received (half of what was paid for). Mr Jarvis appealed for more.

Judgment
Lord Denning MR held that Mr Jarvis could recover damages for the cost of his holiday, but also damages for "disappointment, the distress, the upset and frustration caused by the breach." He said old limitations on damages for distress and disappointment are "out of date". Accordingly, £125 was awarded.

Edmund Davies LJ and Stephenson LJ concurred.

Commentary

Jarvis v Swans Tours Ltd has been called "the Donoghue v Stevenson of Tourism Law".

See also
Measure of damages in English law
Addis v Gramophone Co Ltd [1909] AC 488
Jackson v Horizon Holidays Ltd [1975] 3 All ER 92
Farley v Skinner [2001] UKHL 49

Notes

References
Yates (1973) 36 Modern Law Review 535, who refers to the damages in this case as 'exemplary' rather than for non-pecuniary loss.

External links
Full text of judgment on Bailii
Mörlialp today on the Swiss tourism website

Lord Denning cases
English remedy case law
1973 in British law
Court of Appeal (England and Wales) cases
1973 in case law